Prades is a commune in the Ariège department in southwestern France.

Population
Inhabitants are called Pradéens.

Geography
The village is located in the Pyrenees on the river Hers-Vif.

See also
Communes of the Ariège department

References

Communes of Ariège (department)
Ariège communes articles needing translation from French Wikipedia